Blue Horse is the debut album by The Be Good Tanyas. It was released in 2000 in Canada, and in 2001 in the U.S.

Production
The album was produced by Garth Futcher, and was recorded in a Vancouver-area wooden shack. The last verse of "The Littlest Birds" references Syd Barrett's song Jugband Blues, from the Pink Floyd album A Saucerful Of Secrets.

Critical reception
Exclaim! deemed the album "spooky, drowsy gothic folk performed by three western women with voices like junkie angels." The Independent wrote: "A low-key album made on an impossibly low budget, Blue Horse is one of the most beguiling debuts to be heard this year."

Track listing

References

2000 debut albums
The Be Good Tanyas albums